Hereford World is a trade magazine about the Hereford breed of cattle. The magazine was formed in 1995 when Polled Hereford World merged with American Hereford Journal. The headquarters of Hereford World is in Kansas City, Missouri. It is published eleven times per year.

References

External links
Official website

Agricultural magazines
Business magazines published in the United States
Magazines established in 1995
Magazines published in Missouri
Professional and trade magazines
World